"Maybe I'm Amazed" is a song written by English musician Paul McCartney that was first released on his 1970 debut solo album McCartney.

Although the original recording has never been released as a single, a live performance by McCartney's later band Wings, from the live album Wings over America, was released in 1977; this version became a top-ten hit in the United States and reached number 28 in the United Kingdom.

In 2011, Rolling Stone magazine ranked "Maybe I'm Amazed" number 347 on its "500 Greatest Songs of All Time" list.

History
McCartney wrote the song in 1969, just before the break-up of the Beatles. He credited his wife Linda with helping him get through the difficult time. Although most of his debut solo album was recorded at his home in London, McCartney recorded "Maybe I'm Amazed" entirely in EMI's Number Two studio in Abbey Road, on February 15, 1970. He played all the instruments: guitars, bass, piano, organ, and drums. Although McCartney declined to release the song as a single in 1970, it nonetheless received a great deal of radio airplay worldwide. A promotional film was made, comprising still photographs of McCartney, his wife Linda, stepdaughter Heather, and daughter Mary; it aired in the UK on 19 April 1970 on ITV in its own slot, and later as a part of an episode of CBS Television's The Ed Sullivan Show.

Reception
Regarded as one of McCartney's finest love songs, it achieved the number 347 position in the "500 Greatest Songs of All Time" list compiled by Rolling Stone magazine in November 2004, and is the only solo McCartney song to make the list. In a late 2009 Q&A with journalists held in London to promote his live album Good Evening New York City, McCartney said "Maybe I'm Amazed" was "the song he would like to be remembered for in the future".

In a review for the McCartney album on release, Langdon Winner of Rolling Stone described "Maybe I'm Amazed", as "a very powerful song", that states "one of the main sub-themes of the record, that the terrible burden of loneliness can be dispelled by love." Winner continued to describe the track as "the only song on the album that even comes close to McCartney's best efforts of the past. It succeeds marvelously." In a retrospective review for McCartney, Record Collector has highlighted "Maybe I'm Amazed", along with "Every Night" and "Junk", as songs that "still sound absolutely effortless and demonstrate the man's natural genius with a melody". Joe Tangari of Pitchfork similarly evaluated "Maybe I'm Amazed", along with "Junk" and "Singalong Junk", as the "peaks" of McCartney.

Live version

A live recording from the 1976 album Wings over America was released as a single by McCartney's band Wings on 4 February 1977; it reached number 10 in the US on the Billboard Hot 100, and number 28 in the UK.  This live version is longer than the original and has a slower tempo.

Record World said "Already a classic and familiar track, this version comes without the false ending. You'll be amazed, too."

Versions of the song can be heard on several other live McCartney albums including Back in the U.S. and Back in the World. "Maybe I'm Amazed" has become a centrepiece of McCartney's concerts, along with "Band on the Run" and "Live and Let Die". Live versions of the song are available on the 2011 reissue of McCartney.

Track listing

7"
 "Maybe I'm Amazed" – 5:11
 "Soily" – 5:10

12" US Promo, Record Store Day 2013 EP
Side A
 "Maybe I'm Amazed – Short Version (Mono)" – 3:43
 "Maybe I'm Amazed – Album Version (Mono)" – 5:11

Side B
 "Maybe I'm Amazed – Short Version (Stereo)" – 3:43
 "Maybe I'm Amazed – Album Version (Stereo)" – 5:11

Chart performance

Weekly charts

Year-end charts

Personnel
According to author John C. Winn:

McCartney studio version:
Paul McCartneylead and backing vocals, lead and rhythm guitars, bass, piano, organ, drums
Linda McCartneybacking vocals

Wings Over America live version:
Paul McCartneylead vocals, piano
Linda McCartneybacking vocals, organ
Denny Lainebacking vocals, bass guitar
Jimmy McCullochlead guitar
Joe English – drums

Covers
Billy Joel covered the song for the tribute album The Art of McCartney.
Ruby Starr covered the song for the album Scene Stealer, released in 1976.

References

Sources 

 

1970 songs
1971 singles 
1977 singles
1970s ballads
Rock ballads
Paul McCartney songs
Faces (band) songs
Paul McCartney and Wings songs
Songs written by Paul McCartney
Apple Records singles
Capitol Records singles
Song recordings produced by Paul McCartney
Jem (singer) songs
Norah Jones songs
Music published by MPL Music Publishing
Live singles
Soul ballads
Blue-eyed soul songs